District is the most suitable administrative unit for decentralized planning below the state level as it possesses the required heterogeneity and is small enough to undertake people in planning and implementation and to improve productivity; district planning is an important tool.

With the 73rd and 74th amendments<ref>See 74th Constitutional amendment act 1994</ </ref> of the Constitution of India, decentralization of planning is emphasized and the methodology of district plan was  changed. The approach suggested for the preparation of the district plan is as follows:-.

Steps in district planning
The sequence in the preparation of district plan can be as follows

 Preparation of district vision, block vision and gram panchayat level vision.
 Preparation of participatory plan involving Gram Sabha from Gram Panchayats to Zilla Parishad.
 Preparation of plans by Urban Local Bodies.
 Consolidation of plans prepared by local bodies by District Planning Committees.

Planning starts with the preparation of vision documents by local bodies.

Block vision
After finalizing the vision document for the district at the district level, the document will be discussed at the block level and a vision document for the block will be prepared with some modifications based on the conditions of the block. The vision document for each block need not be completely different because the agro-ecological conditions of some planning units at this level may be same, particularly when a district is divided into a large number of Inter Mediate Panchayats as in the case of Andhra Pradesh. Even though the same vision is adopted for some blocks / mandals, it is necessary to have the vision owned by the Intermediate Panchayat. This exercise will be done by a team of experts at block level. The same team will be responsible for plans at the GP level. However, the team will take some members like professionals or retired persons belonging to the area to assist the team in the preparation of the plan. The general formats for planning at the lowest unit level viz., GP or ULB will be prepared at the district level and they will be adopted with certain modifications at the block level.

Vision of the Gram Panchayat will also be prepared accordingly. The vision of the GP will be based on the Socio-economic Profile of the GP and views of the GP.

Plan for grama panchayat/municipality
At the third stage, the plan at the GP or ULB will be prepared. This will be prepared by the team with the help of people's participation. The will first interact with the GP and prepare a vision on the lines of the district vision. Once the Gram Panchayat vision is approved, the team will conduct several Group Discussions to find out the potentials, needs and constraints of the village economy in Gram Sabha. The felt needs of these communities and the support needed for improving their livelihood conditions will be elicited. Once this exercise is completed, it will be discussed in the Gram Sabha. This approach will help to study the situation thoroughly and prepare the plan. In particular, all the schemes CSS State sponsored schemes will be examined thoroughly with a view to understand their suitability to the area. This can be more easily ascertained from the beneficiaries/stake holders. The plan should also take into account the long term development perspective of the GP and also natural resource management (NRM) aspects.

Plan for block panchayats
The above three steps followed the top down approach in the preparation of the district plan. After this GP Plan is prepared and no plan is ready at higher levels except the vision. The Plans at the higher levels will be prepared in the next steps. In this step, the GP plans will be consolidated and put before the IP. In the GP plans, the benefits of some of the schemes will go beyond the GP and such schemes may figure in the other GP plans also. Hence, they have to be separated and duplication has to be avoided. Similarly, some schemes which provide benefits beyond the GP level may not be identified in any GP. The Block Plan has to identify those schemes / projects. This exercise will be done at the meetings of the Intermediate Panchayat level.

District plan
The final stage is the preparation of the district plan. This will be finalized after the Block Plans are finalized in the same way as the Block Plan is finalized on the basis of the GP Plans in the Block. The schemes that will not figure in the Block Plans, but are essential for the development of the district will be identified at this stage. Further, an attempt will have to be made to achieve functional and spatial integration and use the norms for the provision of social infrastructure.

Integration of entire local plans
In the realization of the district vision, district plans will need to put together resources channelised from all sources including district segments to the State Plan, CSSs, Special Programmes such as Employment Guarantee, Sarva Shiksha Abhiyaan, Rural Health
Mission, Grants-in-aid for specific purposes from Finance Commission, Bharat Nirman etc. Therefore consolidation is a task that goes much beyond compilation and connotes a degree of value addition through integration of local plans. There are several aspects of integration of plans that have to be considered in the preparation of the draft development plan. The different dimensions of integration have been discussed very succinctly in the planning guidelines for local bodies in Kerala as detailed below and could be adapted for general use:
Spatial integration
This would mean integration of schemes such as roads that run through one or more Panchayats. Such kinds of Multi Panchayat infrastructure projects could be taken up with proportionate contributions from the Panchayats concerned dovetailed into the funding available from above and entrusted to one local government for execution.
 Sectoral integration
This relates to the integration that takes place within a sector. For instance, an integrated approach to agricultural development would require the integration of several schemes relating to agriculture, such as horticulture, drip irrigation, high yielding varieties and integrated pest management.
 Cross-sectoral integration
To ensure maximum impact from different interventions, it is necessary to design approaches that draw resources from various schemes. For instance, a good approach to public health would require inputs from water and sanitation allocations and health programme allocations. Again, a typical watershed management programme would comprise soil conservation, water harvesting, micro irrigation, bio-mass generation, fisheries, animal husbandry, agro processing and micro enterprise components, all properly sequenced.
Vertical integration
This is based on the precept that District and Intermediate Panchayats ought to perform activities which have the advantages of scale and which cannot be done by the lower tiers of local government. This will require that Block Panchayats have a clear idea as to what the draft plans of Village Panchayats will contain, Similarly the District Panchayats would need to consider the approved plans of Village and Block Panchayats before finalizing theirs.
Integration of resources
There are several schemes both Centrally sponsored and State sponsored which Panchayats can utilize, integrate into local plans and to which they can contribute additional resources. This would comprise two aspects, as below:
Integration with State Plans
There are several State Plans, which as implemented can be strengthened by increased allocation from Panchayat funds. In some cases a component having a complementary nature could be added to the State Plan Scheme. For instance, the drawing of electric wires to villages could be complemented by the Panchayat taking up the wiring of BPL houses.
Integration of CSSs with local plans
It is important that in the interest of efficient use of resources, there ought to be only one development plan for the local government prepared through a common planning process and not a set of separate plans prepared in accordance with the guidelines of each programme. Thus once priorities and works are identified and prioritized through a single planning process, components pertaining to a particular sector could be taken up through schemes, including CSSs while still keeping within the guidelines of those schemes.
Integration with local resources
Planning can provide for local investments to be catalysed through local resources
or initiatives. For example, village knowledge centers and Rural business Hubs could
be catalysed by Panchayats. This is also possible by extending the concept of Pura to
encompass the concept of rural business hubs. By this, we do not meant that
Panchayats ought to run industry locally, but that it catalogs local skills and natural
resource endowments and facilitate the development of business linkages.
Rural Urban Integration
Integration of urban-rural plans, which is particularly important in the light of increasing
urbanization, is an area where the District Planning Committee could contribute a great
deal. The DPC should work out mechanisms of joint programmes to be financed by State
government institutions and joint contributions by urban and rural local bodies.

See also
 District Planning in Kerala
 District Planning Committees in India
 List of planning agencies in India

References

External links
Manual on Integrated District Planning, Planning Commission of India, 2008
District planning lessons form India Rome, FAO,1995

Local government in India
Economic planning in India